The 2020 UCI ProSeries is the inaugural season of the UCI ProSeries, the second tier road cycling tour, below the UCI World Tour, but above the various regional UCI Continental Circuits.

The 2020 season initially consisted of 58 events of which 31 are one-day races (1.Pro) and 27 are stage races (2.Pro). There are 50 events in Europe, 5 in Asia, and 3 in America. The new calendar, which was presented in mid-May, consists of 29 events.

Winners by race

References

 
2020
UCI ProSeries
UCI ProSeries